Draba verna (syn. Erophila verna), common whitlowgrass, is a species of plant in the cabbage family. It is a small spring-flowering annual which is widely dispersed around the world, and which is found on walls, pavements and patches of bare ground. It has a complex taxonomy which is not yet fully elucidated.

Description
Common whitlowgrass is a spring-flowering annual, typically 5-10 cm tall (sometimes as much as 25 cm) with a basal rosette and one or more leafless flowering stems. It is variably hairy, sometimes almost completely glabrous (hairless), especially on the stems. The elliptical leaves are 5-20 mm long (exceptionally up to 35 mm) and 2-8 mm wide and are often entire, but sometimes with a single tooth on one or both sides, and they taper gradually into a more-or-less distinct petiole. The surfaces and margins usually have a scattering of hairs that are forked, or Y-shaped, at the tips. The central vein is faintly visible on the top side of the leaf but easily distinguishable on the underside. Mature leaves can turn a reddish colour.

Flowering occurs in early spring, March–May in northern latitudes. The flowers have 6 stamens with yellow anthers, and one style. The sepals are about 2 mm long, green, hairy and often have a purplish margin. The fruits, which form immediately after flowering, due to self-pollination, are oval to elliptical, flattened and up to 9 mm long by 3 mm wide.

The seeds are not equipped with any sort of wind dispersal adaptation. In the summer months the seeds remain dormant, and they need about 3 months to after-ripen before they can germinate successfully, during which time they need 5–7 weeks of sunlight or they will not germinate well in the autumn. In experiments, they were found to germinate most successfully at 50% to 60% relative humidity.

Taxonomy
The taxonomy of the genus Draba is extraordinarily complex, particularly for Draba verna, which is sometimes treated as a whole genus (Erophila DC.) in its own right, with a number of different species and varieties listed under various treatments. The reason for this is that D. verna reproduces almost entirely by inbreeding (the flowers pollinating themselves immediately on opening), so a large number of genetically similar lines can be recognised. These lines can even have different chromosome numbers (or ploidy levels), making them less compatible with other plants even when cross-pollination does occur. A full list of synonyms, subspecies and varieties is given in the Brassicaceae Species Checklist. The account here is for Draba verna L. in its original, aggregate, sense, although D. praecox and D. majuscula can be viewed as separate species.

The chromosome number of Draba verna (as the segregate Erophila verna (L.) DC.) is 2n = 30-46. If it is treated as the aggregate, then D. majuscula has 2n = 14, and D. praecox has 2n = 48-56.

The common name "whitlowgrass" refers to a hangnail, which used to be called a whitlow, and was given because some of the leaves have a single forward-pointing tooth on one side, resembling a split fingernail. The "grass" part of the name simply means "plant" and does not imply that it is in the botanical grasses family. Other common names for it include "spring draba", "shadflower", "nailwort", "vernal whitlow grass" and "early whitlow grass".

Identification
The combination of bifid petals (sometimes giving the impression of having flowers with 8 petals) and leafless stems makes this species very easy to identify. Separating it from the critical segregates D. majuscula and D. praecox, if you choose to accept them, is much more difficult. The depth of division of the petals, the hairiness of the leaves and stems, and the length of the petiole are all useful field characters.

Distribution and status
Common whitlowgrass is native to Europe, western Asia and parts of North Africa southwards to Ethiopia. It is also widely established in the temperate regions of the Americas, Australia, New Zealand and Japan. It has been postulated that it was brought to North America when the European colonizers came to the New World.

It is sometimes listed as an invasive species is places where it is introduced, such as the US, but there is no suggestion that it causes any harm. Its global status has not been assessed, but in countries where it is native it is generally listed as "Least Concern."

Habitat and ecology
Typical places for common whitlowgrass to grow include almost any place where there is bare soil, including limestone pavements, sand dunes, field margins, urban pavements and quarry waste.

Its Ellenberg values in Britain are L = 3, F = 3, R = 6, N = 3, and S = 0, which shows that it favours relatively dry, neutral soils and low levels of fertility.

The UK's database of Insects and their Food Plants lists just 4 species that feed on common whitlowgrass. Three of these are weevils: the cabbage leaf weevil, Ceutorhynchus contractus,  the cabbage stem weevil, C. quadridens, and C. hirtulus. The other is a butterfly, the orange tip, which is a common species whose larvae feed on the flowers of plants in the cabbage family.

Uses
There appear to be few recorded uses for whitlowgrass. In the 1600s Culpeper described it as "exceedingly good for those imposthumes in the joints, and under the nails, which they call Whitlows, Felons, Andicorns and Nail-wheals", although some authors have cast doubt on this, and the remedy does not seem to have remained popular into later centuries. Presumably it was thought to have this property according to the doctrine of signatures, owing to the unusual shape of the leaves.

References

verna
Flora without expected TNC conservation status